Cinco fueron escogidos (English: Five Were Chosen) is a 1943 Mexican war film directed by Herbert Kline. It was based on a story by Budd Schulberg, and written by Rafael M. Muñoz and Xavier Villaurrutia.

Plot
The film is set in Yugoslavia occupied by the Wehrmacht. In a small town, a Nazi official is killed, whereupon the occupiers carry out retaliatory measures. Five of the residents of the village are sentenced to death. They represent the different groups of the city: One of them is an aristocrat, one is the mayor, one is one of the city's policemen, one a barber and one an employee. In addition to these five, a homeless man is also to be executed. Their families and neighbors try to obtain the annulment of death sentences.

Cast
Antonio Bravo
Fernando Cortés as Babich, the barber
María Douglas as Mrs. Stojak
Edmundo Espino as Neighbor
Conchita Gentil Arcos as Marfa
María Gentil Arcos as Mrs. Eugenia Dubrovko
Ana María Hernández as Yugoslav village girl
Rafael Icardo as Constable
María Elena Marqués as Ana
Ricardo Montalbán as Stefan
José Morcillo as Mr. Aramich
Joaquín Pardavé as Glinko
José Ignacio Rocha as Train passenger
Humberto Rodríguez as Priest
Ángel T. Sala as Iván Banka
Andrés Soler as Stojak
Jorge Treviño as Yanko
Julio Villarreal as Mr. Anton Dubrovko

Production
There are reports that Cinco fueron escogidos was simultaneously shot alongside an English-language version. In this version appeared, among others, Art Smith, Victor Kilian, Howard Da Silva, Ricardo Montalbán (who also appeared in the original Spanish-language version) and Leonid Kinskey. However, there is no information as to whether this version has ever been released. Cinco fueron escogidos was produced by Alpha Films. It had its premiere in Mexico on 8 July 1943.

References

Bibliography
García Riera, Emilio (1987). México visto por el cine extranjero. Volume 3. Ediciones Era.
Hernández-Girbal, F. (1992). Los que pasaron por Hollywood. BPR Publishers.
Richard, Alfred Charles (1993). Censorship and Hollywood's Hispanic image: an interpretive filmography, 1936–1955. Greenwood Press.
Beck, Nicholas (2001). Budd Schulberg: A Bio-bibliography. Scarecrow Press.
Wilt, David E. (2004). The Mexican Filmography. 1916 through 2001. Jefferson, NC: McFarland & Co. Inc.

External links

1943 films
1943 war films
Mexican war drama films
1940s Spanish-language films
Mexican black-and-white films
Films directed by Herbert Kline
1940s Mexican films
1940s war drama films